Roy Zimmerman may refer to:

 Roy Zimmerman (baseball) (1916–1991), first baseman
 Roy Zimmerman (American football) (1918–1997), running back and quarterback, and fastpitch softball pitcher
 Roy Zimmerman (satirist) (born 1957), American satirical singer-songwriter and guitarist

See also
Leroy Zimmerman (disambiguation)
Zimmerman (disambiguation)